Kimberley Layne Driscoll (born August 12, 1966) is an American politician and lawyer who has served as the 73rd lieutenant governor of Massachusetts since 2023. A member of the Democratic Party, Driscoll previously served as the 50th mayor of Salem from 2006 to 2023. Before becoming mayor, Driscoll served as an elected member of the Salem City Council and worked as the deputy city manager and chief legal counsel for the city of Chelsea.

Early life and career 
Driscoll was born in Hawaii while her father was serving in the United States Navy. Her mother was born in Grenada and raised in Trinidad. Driscoll moved to Salem, Massachusetts, in 1986 and graduated from Salem State College in 1989. She earned a Juris Doctor from the Massachusetts School of Law.

After interning in Salem’s planning department during college, Driscoll became Beverly’s community development director. After graduating from law school, she spent three years as a real estate and commercial development attorney. Driscoll went on to serve as chief legal counsel and then as deputy city manager of Chelsea, Massachusetts for five years. She was a city councilor for the fifth ward in Salem before running for mayor in 2005.

Mayor of Salem 
Driscoll was elected mayor of Salem in 2005, taking office in January 2006 at City Hall. She was re-elected to the position in 2009 with over 80% of the vote, and won again in 2013 and 2017. Driscoll has considered running for higher office, including the United States Senate, United States House of Representatives, or Governor of Massachusetts.

As a result of her leadership, Salem became one of 110 cities and towns in the state of Massachusetts designated as Commonwealth "Green Communities." This status made the city eligible for municipal renewable power and energy efficiency grants from the state. In 2013, Salem received eight stations where drivers can charge their electric vehicles; four are located at the Museum Place Mall, near the Peabody Essex Museum, and the other four are located inside the South Harbor parking garage across the street from the Salem Waterfront Hotel. Also in 2013, under the leadership of Driscoll, the city moved to a mandatory recycling program for trash pick up in Salem.

Driscoll obtained a federal grant to cover 90% of the cost of Nathaniel Bowditch, a $2.1 million 92-foot high-speed catamaran that travels from Salem to Boston annually from May to October. The maiden voyage took place on June 22, 2006. The ferry is named after Nathaniel Bowditch, who was from Salem and wrote the American Practical Navigator. In 2016, Driscoll set up for the Salem acquisition and redevelopment of the parcel at 289 Derby St. into a gateway park along the waterfront.

As of 2017, a $1 billion transformation of the Salem waterfront is underway. The project was originally proposed in 2006, and involved dredging to make the waters deeper for larger boats. In 2016, the city acquired the vacant parcel at 289 Derby Street for redevelopment as gateway park along the waterfront. The Salem Harbor Power Station, an old 1940s coal-powered facility, was replaced with a smaller and cleaner natural gas powered plant, occupying one-half of the original footprint, allowing for additional waterfront redevelopment in the future. 40-acres of prime waterfront land is up for sale, the largest deal in the city's modern history.

Lieutenant governor of Massachusetts 

In January 2022, Driscoll declared her candidacy for lieutenant governor of Massachusetts in the 2022 election. At the Massachusetts Democratic Party State convention in June 2022, Driscoll topped the field with support from 41.4 percent of the delegates, winning the endorsement of the Massachusetts Democratic Party. Since announcing her candidacy, Driscoll consistently led the field in the polls. She won the Democratic primary and faced Republican Leah Cole Allen in the November general election. Driscoll defeated Cole Allen.

On January 5, 2023, Driscoll was inaugurated as the 73rd lieutenant governor of Massachusetts.

References

External links
Office of Mayor Kim Driscoll | City of Salem
Driscoll Campaign website

|-

 
|-

 

1966 births
21st-century American politicians
21st-century American women politicians
American people of Grenadian descent
American people of Trinidad and Tobago descent
American politicians of Caribbean descent
Lieutenant Governors of Massachusetts
Living people
Massachusetts Democrats
Mayors of Salem, Massachusetts
Salem State University alumni
Women mayors of places in Massachusetts